Nuno Filipe Esgueirão Duarte Vieira (born 11 January 1999) is a Portuguese professional footballer who plays for Oliveira do Bairro as a defender.

Club career
On 19 April 2017, Esgueirão made his professional debut with Académica in a 2016–17 LigaPro match against Freamunde.

References

External links

Stats and profile at LPFP
Nuno Esgueirão at ZeroZero

1999 births
Living people
Sportspeople from Coimbra
Portuguese footballers
Association football defenders
Liga Portugal 2 players
Associação Académica de Coimbra – O.A.F. players
Anadia F.C. players